Night Train to Memphis is a 1946 American action film directed by Lesley Selander and written by Dorrell McGowan and Stuart E. McGowan. The film stars Roy Acuff, Allan Lane, Adele Mara, Irving Bacon, Joseph Crehan and Emma Dunn. The film was released on July 12, 1946, by Republic Pictures.

Plot

Cast    
Roy Acuff as Roy Acuff
Roy Acuff's Smoky Mountain Boys as Roy Acuff Band
Allan Lane as Dan Acuff
Adele Mara as Constance Stephenson
Irving Bacon as Rainbow
Joseph Crehan as John Stevenson
Emma Dunn as Ma Acuff
Roy Barcroft as Chad Morgan
Kenne Duncan as Asa Morgan
LeRoy Mason as Wilson
Nick Stewart as Train Porter 
Nina Mae McKinney as Maid
Francis McDonald as Doctor
Joel Friedkin as Minister

References

External links 
 

1946 films
1940s English-language films
American action films
1940s action films
Republic Pictures films
Films directed by Lesley Selander
American black-and-white films
1940s American films